Yarra River is a river in Marlborough District, New Zealand. The river lies completely within the boundary of Molesworth Station. It flows south from its source at Elder Hill in the Boddington Range before turning south east and then north east where it flows into the Acheron River.

See also
List of rivers of New Zealand

References

Rivers of the Marlborough Region
Rivers of New Zealand